Aappilattoq (old spelling: Augpilagtoq) is a village in the Kujalleq municipality in southern Greenland. The name means "red", after the red mountain rising above the settlement in the Greenlandic language. The settlement had 100 inhabitants in 2020.

The area of Aappilattoq has been inhabited since the 19th century, but the present-day village was founded in 1922.

The main occupations and sources of income are hunting and fishing.

Infrastructure and governance 

The median age of the settlement is 31.4 years, the lowest in the municipality. The main settlement service house is maintained and operated by the Kujalleq municipality. There is also a general store operated by KNI, and a general repairs workshop. The local fire station is operated by Nanortalik fire department.

The settlement also houses a school, Jaajap atuarfia, which had 22 pupils in 2006. Appilattoq also has its own church.

Together with the settlements Narsarmijit and Tasiusaq the village is governed by a joint council. The head of the council is Hans Levisen.

Until December 31, 2008, the settlement belonged to the Nanortalik municipality. Since January 1, 2009, the settlement has been part of the Kujalleq municipality, when the former municipalities of Qaqortoq, Narsaq, and Nanortalik ceased to exist as administrative entities.

Transportation 

The settlement has a heliport operated by Air Greenland. The village is served as part of government contract, with mostly cargo helicopter flights. The main transportation routes are via air or sea. The village is practically inaccessible via land due to its remote location and the surrounding mountain region. Every summer a few large or very large cruise ships go through Prince Christian Sound and pass Aappilattoq. The largest cruise ship believed to have passed by is Voyager of the Seas in September 2022

Geography 
Aappilattoq is located east of Nanortalik, roughly 50 km north of Cape Farewell, the southern cape of Greenland. including Prince Christian Sound, a 100 km long, steep and -2 km wide fjord.

Mountains

Climate
Aappilatoq has a wet tundra climate (ET) with heavy precipitation and cold to very cold weather year-round.

Population 
Most towns and settlements in southern Greenland exhibit negative growth patterns over the last two decades, with many settlements rapidly depopulating. The population of Aappilattoq has decreased by more than a third relative to the 1990 levels, and by over 20 percent relative to the 2000 levels.

References 

Kujalleq
Populated places in Greenland